Shaun Johnson (born 9 September 1990) is a New Zealand professional rugby league footballer who plays as a  or  for the New Zealand Warriors in the National Rugby League (NRL) and the New Zealand Kiwis at international level.

He has played previously for the Cronulla-Sutherland Sharks in the NRL and has played at representative level for the NRL All Stars in 2013. In 2014 Johnson won the Golden Boot Award for the world's best player.

Background
Johnson was born in Auckland, New Zealand, and his mother is Laotian and his father is a New Zealander.

From Whangaparaoa, Johnson attended Orewa College and played many sports, including basketball and rugby union, but made his name playing touch and Australian rules football. He represented New Zealand in both touch and Australian rules football and played rugby union in his school's First XV.

Playing career

Early years
Johnson played for the Hibiscus Coast Raiders in the Auckland Rugby League competition before being signed by the New Zealand Warriors in 2009. 

Johnson started his professional career playing for the Junior Warriors in the Toyota Cup. In March 2009, league great Andrew Johns commented: "I haven't been this excited about a player in a long time." Johns was referring to the first time he saw Stacey Jones play, which was in 1995, when Stacey was a junior. Johnson spent the 2009 and 2010 seasons with the Junior Warriors and played 45 matches, scoring 25 tries, 159 goals and 4 field goals to finish his Toyota Cup career with 422 points. Johnson made his NSW Cup debut for the Auckland Vulcans in 2010 and also represented the Junior Kiwis that year. His final Toyota Cup match was being part of the Junior Warriors winning the 2010 Grand Final.

2011
After suffering an injury in the pre-season, Johnson spent the start of the 2011 season with the Auckland Vulcans before making his National Rugby League debut in Round 13 against the Sydney Roosters due to an injury to Brett Seymour. In his next match in Round 14 against the Wests Tigers at Mt Smart Stadium, Johnson scored his first NRL try in the Warriors 26–22 loss. In Round 22 against the Brisbane Broncos at Suncorp Stadium, Johnson scored an outstanding 70-metre solo try in the Warriors 20–21 loss. In the 2011 Preliminary Final against the Melbourne Storm, Johnson set up a mesmerising try for Lewis Brown to seal the game in the 76th minute to beat the Storm 20–12 at AAMI Park, The Warriors made it to the Grand Final, playing the Manly-Warringah Sea Eagles. The Warriors lost to the Sea Eagles 24–10 in the 2011 NRL Grand Final however Johnson played a tremendous game and almost sparked a surprise comeback with a role in both tries and a few outstanding runs. Johnson finished his debut year in the NRL with him playing 16 matches and scoring 6 tries for the Warriors in the 2011 NRL season. 

Johnson was named in the New Zealand national rugby league team squad for the 2011 Four Nations but withdrew with an injury. On 27 November 2011, Johnson re-signed with the Warriors until the end of the 2014 season.

2012
In his debut test match Johnson scored an 80-metre intercept try at Eden Park in the Kiwis 20–12 loss. Along with Konrad Hurrell and Manu Vatuvei, Johnson was the 2012 New Zealand Warriors season top try-scorer with 12 in 22 matches. Johnson also received the Rugby League International Federation's Rookie of the Year award for 2012.

2013
On 13 February 2013, Johnson was chosen to play in the 2013 All Stars match for the NRL All Stars team, playing off the interchange bench in the 32–6 loss to the Indigenous All Stars at Suncorp Stadium. 

For the 2013 Anzac Test, Johnson was selected to play halfback for New Zealand, kicking two goals from two attempts in their 32–12 loss against Australia at Canberra Stadium. In Round 14 against the Sydney Roosters, Johnson chased down Michael Jennings after the latter picked up a loose ball and sprinted toward an undefended try line, Warriors later won the match 23–12 at SFS. Johnson played in all the Warriors' 24 matches and scored 10 tries in the 2013 NRL season. 

Following the end of the season, Johnson was selected in New Zealand 2013 Rugby League World Cup squad. In the Rugby League World Cup Semi Finals on 24 November against England at Wembley Stadium, after the game was locked-up at 8-all at halftime and England lead 18–14, with seconds to go in the game, Johnson scored the final try of the game in the 80th minute, stepping and sliding through a hole to level the score at 18-all and then converting his own try to seal the win and to cement the Kiwis' place in the World Cup final. Following the Kiwis 34–2 World Cup Final loss to Australia at Old Trafford, Johnson finished the tournament as the top points-scorer with 76 points (4 tries and 30 goals).

2014
In February 2014, Johnson played in the Warriors inaugural NRL Auckland Nines squad and was the tournament's top point scorer with 40 points.  He was named the tournament's most valuable player. On 9 February 2015, Johnson re-signed with the Warriors on a 3-year contract to the end of the 2017 season. He was selected for New Zealand in the 2014 Anzac Test against Australia at halfback and kicked 3 goals in the Kiwis 30–18 loss at the SFS. By the end of the Warriors 2014 NRL season he had played in 21 matches, scoring 9 tries, kicking 63 goals and a field goal. On 7 October 2014, Johnson was selected in New Zealand's 2014 Four Nations squad. On 15 November 2014, Johnson was instrumental in leading the Kiwi side to a 22–18 victory in the 2014 Four Nations final against Australia. He received the man of the match award after his performance, which included two assists and one try. On 18 December 2014, Johnson won the Rugby League World Golden Boot Award for best player in the world, beating the likes of Sam Burgess, Johnathan Thurston and Greg Inglis.

2015
On 16 January 2015, Johnson was named captain of the Warriors 2015 Auckland Nines squad. Johnson was selected for New Zealand in the 2015 Anzac Test against Australia at halfback, scoring a try and kicking 3 goals in the Kiwis 26–12 win at Suncorp Stadium. In Round 9 against the Cronulla-Sutherland Sharks, Johnson scored one of the best tries of the 2015 season when he evaded 5 defenders to score the try which won the match for the Warriors 20–16 in the last minute at Remondis Stadium. In Round 20 against the Manly-Warringah Sea Eagles, Johnson suffered a season-ending ankle injury while scoring a try in the Warriors 32–12 loss at Mt Smart Stadium. Johnson finished the 2015 NRL season with him playing in 18 matches, scoring 8 tries, kicking 48 goals and 2 field goals for the Warriors.

2016
On 29 January, Johnson was named as the captain of the Warriors 2016 Auckland Nines squad, On 6 May 2016, Johnson played for the New Zealand national rugby league team against Australia, playing at halfback in the 16–0 loss at Hunter Stadium. Shaun Johnson was part of the Four Nations 2016 New Zealand Kiwis side that made it to the Final of the tournament, losing to the Australian Kangaroos 34–8.

2017
Shaun Johnson became New Zealand rugby league's greatest test points scorer as the Kiwis beat Scotland 74–6.
Johnson's second-half try broke Matthew Ridge's record of 168 points.
His 22-points total from the Rugby League World Cup match took him to 175 points.

2018
After helping to guide the Warriors back to the finals the Warriors were bundled out by the Penrith Panthers in the first round of the NRL playoffs. On 27 November Johnson was granted an immediate release from the final year of his contract with the New Zealand Warriors.
On 1 December the Cronulla Sharks announced that they had signed Johnson on a 3-year deal.

On 10 December, Johnson spoke to the media after leaving the New Zealand Warriors and took aim at his former coach Stephen Kearney saying “I’ve been at Auckland for eight years and had six coaches, The sixth coach didn’t like me, so what".

Johnson then went on to speak about his motivations for joining Cronulla saying "They're a club that want to do well," Johnson said of the Warriors. "They're a club that's looking to win a premiership and if they don't see me as worthy of what they were paying me that's fine. If it was all about the money I would have stayed there. I would have stayed and played my contract out. I'm here to win a premiership at Cronulla".

2019
Johnson made his debut for Cronulla-Sutherland in Round 1 of the 2019 NRL season against Newcastle which ended in a 14–8 loss. Johnson scored his first try for Cronulla in Round 5 against the Sydney Roosters at Shark Park which ended in a 30–16 loss. In Round 7, Johnson was taken from the field in Cronulla's 29–6 loss against Brisbane which was later revealed to be a torn hamstring and was ruled out for 4–6 weeks.

In Round 15, Johnson scored a try but missed all three attempts at goal as Cronulla suffered a shock 14–12 loss against last placed Canterbury-Bankstown at ANZ Stadium. The following week against Brisbane, Johnson was relieved of his goal kicking duties which were taken over by Chad Townsend. Johnson was later substituted in the second half by coach John Morris as Cronulla lost 24–22. This was the third game in a row the club had lost due to poor goal kicking.

Johnson made a total of 18 appearances for Cronulla in his first season at the club as they finished in 7th spot on the table and qualified for the finals. Johnson played in the club's elimination final defeat by Manly at Brookvale Oval.

2020
In round 19 of the 2020 NRL season, Johnson was taken from the field during the second half in Cronulla's match against the Sydney Roosters with a serious leg injury.  It was later revealed that Johnson had snapped his Achilles tendon and was ruled out for the remainder of the year.

2021
In round 7 of the 2021 NRL season, Johnson made his return to the Cronulla side in an 18–12 loss against Canterbury-Bankstown at Kogarah Oval.

On 3 June, Johnson was informed by Cronulla-Sutherland that his services would not be required beyond the 2021 NRL season.

In round 14 against Penrith, Johnson kicked the winning field goal as Cronulla won the match 19-18.

On 25 June, it was announced that Johnson would re-join the New Zealand Warriors on a two-year deal.
On 27 July, it was revealed that Johnson would be ruled out from playing for at least eight weeks after suffering a hamstring injury.
On 2 August, it was announced that Johnson would miss the rest of the 2021 NRL season.

2022
In round 5 of the 2022 NRL season, Johnson kicked the winning field goal for the New Zealand Warriors in their 25-24 golden point victory over North Queensland.
In round 8, Johnson kicked a field goal in golden point extra time to win the game for New Zealand 21-20 over Canberra.
Johnson made a total of 21 appearances for the New Zealand club as they finished 15th on the table.

Career stats

References

External links

Cronulla Sharks profile
New Zealand Warriors profile
Warriors profile
2017 RLWC profile

1990 births
Living people
Auckland rugby league team players
Cronulla-Sutherland Sharks players
Hibiscus Coast Raiders players
Junior Kiwis players
New Zealand national rugby league team players
New Zealand people of Laotian descent
New Zealand rugby league players
New Zealand sportsmen
New Zealand Warriors players
Northcote Tigers players
NRL All Stars players
People educated at Orewa College
Rugby league halfbacks
Rugby league players from Auckland
Touch footballers